Walsh v Lonsdale (1882) 21 Ch D 9 is an English property law case about the effect of the Judicature Acts. It is the authority for the equitable maxim that "Equity regards as done that which ought to be done". It created the doctrine of anticipation, whereby a specifically performable agreement to create or transfer a property right will be good in equity, even if not finally effective at law.

Facts
Mr Lonsdale agreed to lease Mr Walsh a mill for seven years. Rent varied with the number of looms being operated, but there was a minimum dead rent paid yearly in advance on demand. The lease was not in fact granted by deed (as was required for leases over three years), yet Mr Walsh moved in and began paying rent quarterly. Mr Lonsdale demanded payment in advance and levied distress for non payment of rent. If the terms of the agreement were enforceable, then Mr Lonsdale had acted lawfully.

Judgment
The Court of Appeal held that as it now had jurisdiction to apply equitable principle, it would regard that as done which ought to be done, and so the lease had been effective in absence of the formality. Lord Jessel MR said the following.

Significance
The Walsh v Lonsdale principle is now embodied in the recognition by the courts of the equitable lease.

See also
Maxims of equity

Notes

References

English property case law
1882 in British law
1882 in case law
Court of Appeal (England and Wales) cases